A Judenrat was an administrative body established in German-occupied Europe during World War II which purported to represent a Jewish community in dealings with the Nazi authorities. The Germans required Jews to form Judenräte across the occupied territories at local and sometimes national levels.

Judenräte were particularly common in Nazi ghettos in Eastern Europe where in some cases, such as the Łódź Ghetto, and in Theresienstadt, they were known as the "Jewish Council of Elders" (Jüdischer Ältestenrat or Ältestenrat der Juden). Jewish communities themselves had established councils for self-government as early as the Middle Ages. The Jewish community used the Hebrew term Kahal (קהל) or Kehillah (קהילה), whereas the German authorities generally used the term Judenräte.

Nazi considerations of Jewish legal status
The structure and missions of the Judenräte under the Nazi regime varied widely, often depending upon whether meant for a single ghetto, a city or a whole region. Jurisdiction over a whole country, as in Nazi Germany, was maintained by Reichsvereinigung der Juden in Deutschland (Reich's Association of the Jews in Germany) established on 4 July 1939.

In the beginning of April 1933, shortly after the National Socialist government took power, a report by a German governmental commission on fighting the Jews was presented. This report recommended the creation of a recognized 'Association of Jews in Germany' (Verband der Juden in Deutschland), to which all Jews in Germany would be forced to associate.  Appointed by the Reichskanzler, a German People's Ward was then to assume responsibility of this group.  As the leading Jewish organization, it was envisioned that this association would have a 25-member council called the Judenrat. However, the report was not officially acted upon.

The Israeli historian Dan Michman found it likely that the commission, which considered the legal status and interactions of Jews and non-Jews before their emancipation, reached back to the Medieval Era for the term Judenräte. This illuminates the apparent intent to make the Jewish emancipation and assimilation invalid, and so return Jews to the status they held during the Medieval Era.

Occupied territories

The first actual Judenräte were established in occupied Poland under Reinhard Heydrich's orders on 21 September 1939, during the German assault on Poland, and later in the occupied territories of the Soviet Union.

The Judenräte were to serve as a means to enforce the occupation force's anti-Jewish regulations and laws in the western and central areas of Poland, and had no authority of their own. Ideally, a local Judenrat was to include rabbis and other influential people of their local Jewish community. Thus, enforcement of laws could be better facilitated by the German authorities by using established Jewish authority figures and personages, while undermining external influences.

Further Judenräte were established on 18 November 1939, upon the orders of Hans Frank, head of the Generalgouvernment. These councils were to have 12 members for Jewish communities of 10,000 or fewer, and up to 24 members for larger Jewish communities.  Jewish communities were to elect their own councils, and by the end of 1939 were to have selected an executive and assistant executive as well.  Results were to be presented to the German city or county controlling officer for recognition.  While theoretically democratic, in reality the councils were often determined by the occupiers.  While the German occupiers only minimally involved themselves in the voting, those whom the Germans first chose often refused participation to avoid becoming exploited by the occupiers.  As a rule, therefore, the traditional speaker of the community was named and elected, preserving the community continuity.

Missions and duties

The Nazis systematically sought to weaken the resistance potential and opportunities of the Jews of Central and Eastern Europe. The early Judenräte were foremost to report numbers of their Jewish populations, clear residences and turn them over, present workers for forced labour, confiscate valuables, and collect tribute and turn these over. Failure to comply would incur the risk of collective punishments or other measures. Later tasks of the Judenräte included turning over community members for deportation. Ultimately, these policies and the cooperation of Jewish authorities led to massive Jewish deaths with few German casualties because of the minimal resistance.  Once under Nazi control and checked for weapons, large numbers of Jews could ultimately be easily murdered or enslaved.  The sadness of the catastrophically large number of deaths because of this lack of resistance led to the saying "never again".

Through these occupation measures, and the simultaneous prevention of government services, the Jewish communities suffered serious shortages. For this reason, early Judenräte attempted to establish replacement service institutions of their own. They tried to organize food distribution, aid stations, old age homes, orphanages and schools. At the same time, given their restricted circumstances and remaining options, they attempted to work against the occupier's forced measures and to win time. One way was to delay transfer and implementation of orders and to try playing conflicting demands of competing German interests against each other. They presented their efforts as indispensable for the Germans in managing the Jewish community, in order to improve the resources of the Jews and to move the Germans to repeal collective punishments.

This had, however, very limited positive results. The generally difficult situations presented often led to perceived unfair actions, such as personality preferences, sycophancy, and protectionism of a few over the rest of the community. Thus, the members of the community quickly became highly critical of, or even outright opposed their Judenrat.

Tadeusz Piotrowski cites Jewish survivor Baruch Milch stating "Judenrat became an instrument in the hand of the Gestapo for extermination of the Jews... I do not know of a single instance when the Judenrat would help some Jew in a disinterested manner." through Piotrowski cautions that "Milch's is a particular account of a particular place and time... the behavior of Judenrat members was not uniform."

The question of whether participation in the Judenrat constituted collaboration with the Germans remains a controversial issue to this day. The view that Jewish councils collaborated in the Holocaust has been challenged by Holocaust historians including Isaiah Trunk in his 1972 book, Judenrat: The Jewish Councils in Eastern Europe Under Nazi Occupation. Summarizing Trunk's research, Holocaust scholar Michael Berenbaum writes: "In the final analysis, the Judenräte had no influence on the frightful outcome of the Holocaust; the Nazi extermination machine was alone responsible for the tragedy, and the Jews in the occupied territories, most especially Poland, were far too powerless to prevent it." This remains a topic of considerable scholarly disagreement.

Ghettos

Judenräte were responsible for the internal administration of ghettos, standing between the Nazi occupiers and their Jewish communities. In general, the Judenräte represented the elite from their Jewish communities. Often, a Judenrat had a group for internal security and control, a Jewish Ghetto Police (German: Jüdische Ghetto-Polizei or Jüdischer Ordnungsdienst). They also attempted to manage the government services normally found in a city, such as those named above.  However, the Germans requiring them to deliver community members for forced labor or deportation to concentration camps, placed them in the position of cooperating with the German occupiers. To resist such orders was to risk summary execution, or quick replacement and inclusion in the next concentration-camp shipment.

In a number of cases, such as the Minsk ghetto and the Łachwa ghetto, Judenräte cooperated with the resistance movement. In other cases, Judenräte cooperated with the Germans (although, as discussed above, the extent of this collaboration remains debated).

See also 
 Ghetto uprisings
 Adam Czerniaków, head of the Warsaw Ghetto Judenrat
 Dov Lopatyn, head of the Judenrat in Łachwa, German-occupied Poland
 Mordechai Chaim Rumkowski, head of the Council of Elders in the Łódź Ghetto
 Bratislava Working Group, a resistance organisation formed by members of the  Judenrat in Bratislava, Slovakia
 Theresienstadt Ghetto, a fortress in Bohemia where a Nazi-appointed "cultural council" organized the life of the Jewish prisoners.

References

Literature
 Isaiah Trunk:Judenrat. The Jewish Councils in Eastern Europe under Nazi Occupation, Stein & Day, 1977, 
 V. Wahlen:Select Bibliography on Judenraete under Nazi Rule, in: Yad Vashem Studies 10/1974, s. 277-294
 Aharon Weiss:Jewish Leadership in Occupied Poland.  Postures and Attitudes, in Yad Vashem Studies 12/1977, s. 335-365
 Marian Fuks: Das Problemm der Judenraete und Adam Czerniaks Anstaendigkeit. inSt. Jersch-Wenzel: Deutsche - Polen - Juden Colloquium, Berlin, 1987 , s. 229-239
 Dan Diner: Jenseits der Vorstellbaren- Der "Judenrat" als Situation. In: Hanno Loewy, Gerhard Schoenberner: "Unser Einziger Weg ist Arbeit."  Das Ghetto in Lodz 1940–1944.. Vienna 1990, 
 Dan Diner: Gedaechtniszeiten.  Ueber Juedische und Andere Geschichten. Beck 2003, 
 Doron Rabinovici: Instanzen der Ohnmacht. Wien 1938–1945. Der Weg zum Judenrat. Juedischer Verlag bei Suhrkamp, 2000, 
 Dan Michman: 'Jewish "Headships" under Nazi Rule: The Evolution and Implementation of an Administrative Concept', in: Dan Michman: Holocaust Historiography, a Jewish Perspective. Conceptualizations, Terminology, Approaches and Fundamental Issues, London/Portland, Or.: Vallentine Mitchell, 2003, pp. 159–175. 
 Dan Michmann: 'On the Historical Interpretation of the Judenräte Issue: Between Intentionalism, Functionalism and the Integrationist Approach of the 1990s', in: Moshe Zimmermann (ed.), On Germans and Jews under the Nazi Regime. Essays by Three Generations of Historians. A Festschrift in Honor of Otto Dov Kulka (Jerusalem: The Hebrew University Magnes Press, 2006), pp. 385–397.

External links
 Documents about the Judenrat in the Ghetto Terezín (Theresienstadt) in the collection of the Jewish Museum Prague.
 Correspondence between JDC and representatives of Jewish community organizations located inside the Collection: Records of the American Joint Distribution Committee: Warsaw office, 1939–1941

 
Nazi terminology
Holocaust terminology